WRVR (104.5 FM, branded "The River 104.5") is an adult contemporary radio station broadcasting in Memphis, Tennessee. It has broadcast this format for at least 34 years as of 2021. Owned by Audacy, Inc., the station's studios are located in Southeast Memphis, and the transmitter tower is in Cordova, Tennessee, outside Memphis.

WRVR broadcasts in the HD Radio format.

The station plays pop and soft rock music from the 1970s to the present.  1960s music is occasionally played, and every year from mid-November to December 25, WRVR plays varieties of Christmas music, temporarily replacing its AC format.

History
The 104.5 frequency originally aired religious-oriented programs with the call letters WTCV; later, it carried an easy-listening format with the call letters WAID.  On April 23, 1975, it switched formats to MOR with the call letters WQUD and was branded "Quad 104." It was also the sister station at the time of WDIA (which is where the former WAID call letters—in reverse—came from).

"The River" branding is a local reference to the Mississippi River.

The station's license is currently held by Entercom Communications. It is one of six radio properties in the Memphis market held by Entercom; the others are WMC-FM, WMC-AM, WMFS, WLFP, and WMFS-FM. WRVR maintains studios in the Entercom complex in eastern Memphis.  Prior to Entercom, the stations were owned by CBS Radio until 2006.

The "WRVR" call letters previously belonged to an FM jazz station in New York City broadcasting at 106.7 FM from 1961 to 1980. (That station is now WLTW.)

In October 2017, morning show hosts Mike Montana and Mandy Morgan exited WRVR, leaving a rare opening during the morning-drive timeslot.  In January 2018, longtime Memphis radio morning show host Ron Olson, from sister station WMC-FM ("FM100"), switched to mornings on WRVR.  His former WMC-FM co-host Karen Perrin joined him again as a morning show partner on WRVR.

Former Logos

References

External links

RVR
RVR
Mainstream adult contemporary radio stations in the United States
Audacy, Inc. radio stations
1968 establishments in Tennessee
Radio stations established in 1968